The 2013 Anti–Sri Lanka protests are a series of student protests and agitations initiated by the Students Federation for Freedom of Tamil Eelam in Tamil Nadu, India, against war crimes committed against Sri Lankan Tamil people by Sri Lankan army during the Eelam War IV. The protesters demanded that the Government of India vote in support of a United Nations Human Rights Council (UNHRC) resolution censuring the Government of Sri Lanka for war crimes. Some radical groups even demanded the prosecution of the President of Sri Lanka, Mahinda Rajapakse for his role in the alleged genocide of Sri Lankan Tamils. Apart from college students, doctors, film personalities and employees of IT companies also participated in the protests.

Protests in Tamil Nadu 
The agitations started on 11 March 2013 when eight students of Loyola College, Chennai, who fasted in condemnation of alleged atrocities committed on Tamils in Sri Lanka were arrested by the Tamil Nadu police. The arrest was criticised by student organisations as well as the Loyola College management and nine colleges across the city went on strike. The following protests see students from all over Tamil Nadu take into streets, it was a massive outrage of Tamil Nadu people and students against sinhala government after 1983 anti-Tamil pogrom. From school to colleges a mass number of students participated in the protest. Students from other states lik who are studying in Tamil Nadu colleges too participated. Numerous protests, rallies held in marina beach which saw huge number of students. The anger and anguish of students turned against DMK and Congress which is the ruling party during 2009 Eelam war.   A statewide general strike declared on 12 March 2013 by the Tamil Eelam Supporters Organisation (TESO) evoked a mixed response with most of the political parties in the state keeping aloof alleging inaction on the part of the main participant Dravida Munnetra Kazhagam (DMK) which was in power during the decisive stages of Eelam War IV. Student organisations called for statewide agitations on Monday, 18 March, forcing arts and science colleges in the state to close down for an indefinite period. As colleges and schools remained closed student groups organised protest through social media, Tamilandu people who themselves are sympathetic towards Sri Lankan Tamils sent their children to take part in the protests. As protests peaked in Tamil Nadu national and international media provided good coverage. One remarkable effect of this protest is DMK chief Karuna fearing students outrage pulled out of congress alliance, On 19 March DMK chief announced withdrawal from UPA alliance citing Congress disregard to the suffering of Eelam Tamil. When DMK pulled out of UPA it was well received by DMK supporters. Congress was isolated in Tamil Nadu in 2014 general elections it contested in 40 seats alone and lost in all constituencies. But ironically DMK formed alliance with congress again in May 2016 Tamil Nadu state elections showing its own colors.

On 18 March 2013, large-scale agitations were held outside Raj Bhavan, Chennai resulting in the arrest of over 500 students. A Sri Lankan Buddhist monk was attacked in the Brihadeeswara Temple, Thanjavur on 16 March 2013 and another at Chennai Central on 17 March 2013. The Government of Tamil Nadu declared the indefinite closure of 525 engineering colleges affiliated to the Anna University.

On 2 April 2013, actors from Tamil film industry staged a one-day token fast in support of student protests in Tamil Nadu.

Tamil Nadu Assembly Resolution
The Tamil Nadu State Legislative Council passed legislation on 27 March 2013 urging the Indian Government to slap economic sanctions on Sri Lanka and demand for the formation of a separate state for the Tamils of Sri Lanka.

The resolution which was proposed by Tamil Nadu Chief Minister Jayalalitha was unanimously passed at the Assembly. The resolution was passed following the debate in the Council regarding the ongoing statewide students protests in Tamil Nadu.

The resolution demanded the formation of a separate state in Sri Lanka, through the means of a referendum by a resolution at the UN Security Council which should be conducted among Tamils in Sri Lanka and other displaced Tamils across the world.

Moving the resolution, Jayalalithaa said the ongoing students protest was reflective of her government's initiative on the Sri Lankan issue even as she requested them to withdraw the stir and resume classes.

The resolution also called on the Indian Government to stop considering Sri Lanka as a 'friendly country' and impose economic sanctions, as well as calling for an international inquiry in "genocide and war crimes" against Sri Lankan Tamils.

In United Kingdom 
On 20 June 2013, during 2013 ICC Champions Trophy semi final match between India and Sri Lanka at the SWALEC Stadium in Cardiff, Tamil Eelam supporters invaded the pitch with the flags of the Tamil Eelam. After the match, at least 400 protesters held up the Sri Lankan team bus and raised anti-Sri Lankan government slogans.

See also
2013 Tamil Nadu Assembly Resolution on Sri Lanka
Attacks on Sri Lankans in Tamil Nadu
Protests against the Sri Lankan Civil War

References

External links 
 Tamilrising.com

2010s in Tamil Nadu
2013 in India
2013 protests
Student protests in India
Tamil Nadu state legislation
Resolutions (law)
Assembly votes
India–Sri Lanka relations
Indian Peace Keeping Force
Foreign intervention in the Sri Lankan Civil War